Pavonia strictiflora is a species of Pavonia found in Bahia and São Paulo, Brazil.

References

External links

Hibisceae
Flora of Brazil